The Woodlawn School Building is a historic former school building near the junction of Bizzell Road and Arkansas Highway 31 in Woodlawn, Lonoke County, Arkansas.  It is a single-story wood-frame structure, built with Craftsman styling in 1921.  It has a gable-on-hip roof with extended eaves and exposed rafter tails, and large knee brackets supporting the gable ends.  The school consolidated three rural school districts.

The building was listed on the National Register of Historic Places in 1993.  It now serves as the community center of the Woodlawn community.

See also

National Register of Historic Places listings in Lonoke County, Arkansas

References

Bungalow architecture in Arkansas
School buildings on the National Register of Historic Places in Arkansas
School buildings completed in 1921
Buildings and structures in Lonoke County, Arkansas
National Register of Historic Places in Lonoke County, Arkansas
1921 establishments in Arkansas